Niu Heting (1930–1997), better known by his pen name Wolong Sheng, was a Chinese writer of wuxia novels.

Niu was born in Zhenping County, Henan, China. He published about 30 novels in a span of over two decades and his works dominated the modern wuxia genre until Gu Long came into the scene.

Novels
Windblown Dust, Hidden Hero 
Rainbow-Startling Sword Shakes the Rivers and Lakes 
Flying Swallow Startles the Dragon 
Iron Flute, Divine Sword 
Jade Hairpin Oath 
Heavenly Fragrant Whirlwind 
Nameless Flute 
The Tiger's Den 
Red Snow, Black Frost 
The Delicate Hand Incident 
Inseparable Hero Companions 
Golden Sword, Eagle Feathers 
The Weathered Swallow Returns 
Heavenly Sword, Superb Sabre 
Twin Phoenix Flags 
Fluttering Flower Decree 
Favor-Returning Sword 
Heavenly Crane Manual 
The Sword As a Matchmaker 
Holy Sword, Sentimental Sabre 
Iron Sword, Jade Pendant 
Kingfisher Sleeve, Jade Bracelet 
Escort Banner 
Gallant Heroes of China 
Hero Shadow, Demon Tracks 
Winter Plum, Proud Frost 
Jade Hand Assignment 
Flying Bell 
Flying Dragon of the Remote Regions 
Shake the Flower, Release the Hawk 
Bloody Sword, Loyal Heart 
Gold Phoenix Arrow 
The Golden Brush Dots the Eye of the Dragon 
Invisible Sword 
Flower Phoenix 
Smoke Locks the Rivers and Lakes 
Spring and Autumn Brush 
Black and White Sword 
Four Spirit Beauties 
The Sword that Leaves No Mark 
Heavenly Dragon Armor 
Chivalry and Tenderness 
Flying Flower Chases the Moon
Frost Raiment of the Heavenly Steed

External links
Wolong Sheng
Wu Jizun Site devoted to Wuxia novels, manhua and translations
Swallow and Dragon - An ongoing translation into English of a famous Wolong Sheng novel.
 Wolong Sheng Wuxia Novels

Wuxia writers
1930 births
1997 deaths
Taiwanese male novelists
Republic of China novelists
Writers from Nanyang, Henan
20th-century novelists
Chinese male novelists
Taiwanese people from Henan
20th-century Chinese male writers